College Hill School was a segregated public school for African American students established in 1883 in Cleveland, Bradley County, Tennessee, United States. An historical marker commemorates the school's history. It was also known as College Hill High School.

History 
Charles Henry Turner had served as the principal in 1906. In 1925, a brick school building for the school was completed. The school was closed in 1966 after desegregation. The school building was destroyed in a 1966 fire but its gymnasium and another part of the school became part of the Northeast Recreation Center, named the College Hill Recreation Center. Alumni held a celebration in 2023.

College Hill is a community.

References

Historically segregated African-American schools in Tennessee
Educational institutions established in 1883
Educational institutions disestablished in 1966
Education in Bradley County, Tennessee
Articles needing coordinates